1016 is the third studio album by Spanish singer Alfred García. It was released on 14 December 2018 by Universal Music Spain. The album includes the singles "" and "Wonder". The album peaked at number 2 on the Spanish Albums Chart.  In support of his debut studio album, 1016, García embarked on the 1016 Tour, which began on February 28, 2019 and ended on November 9, 2019. The album was re-released on 1 November 2019 titled 1016. El Círculo Rojo.

Singles
"De la Tierra hasta Marte" was released as the lead single from the album on 5 December 2018. The song peaked at number 12 on the Spanish Singles Chart. "Wonder" was released as the second single from the album on 7 June 2019. The song peaked at number 95 on the Spanish Singles Chart. "Londres" was released as the third single from the album on 27 September 2019. "Amar volar al invierno" was released as the lead single from the re-released album on 10 November 2019.

Track listing

Charts

Weekly charts

Year-end charts

Certifications

Release history

References

2018 albums